This is a list of djed of the Bosnian Church. The title djed (literally "grandfather") was used of the head of the indigenous Bosnian Church from the late 13th century into the 15th.

List of djed 
The first twelve names on the list below are found in a single column in Batalo's Gospel, a manuscript made for the Bosnian nobleman Batalo in 1393 and often called Red gospodina Rastudija. They are listed in reverse order, with the name of the incumbent djed Rastudije first followed by his predecessors back to Ratko in the late 13th century. The list does not have dates for their reigns, but a few of them are known from other acts. If the list was complete at the time it was written down, then Ratko was either the first to use the title djed or represents a break in the history of the Bosnian church.

Ratko I (probably 1270s)
Boleslav
Miroslav (fl. 1305×7)
Radoslav I (fl. c. 1322)
Radoslav II
Povržen
Dragost
Hlapoje
Radovan I
Radovan II
Radoje
Rastudije (fl. 1393)
Radomir (fl. 1404)
Miloje (fl. 1446)
Ratko II (fl. c. 1450)

Batalo's other list 
Another list, containing 16 names, appears in a column to the left of the list of djed in Batalo's Gospel. This has sometimes been taken for a list of Ratko's predecessors, but it does not line up with known data and how it should be read in relation to the other column is not clear. Three of the names—Dragič, Ljubin and Dražeta—are known from the abjuration of Bilino Polje in 1203, so the list is perhaps a list of revered Bosnian monks (not bishops).

 Jeremija 
 Azarija 
 Kukleč 
 Ivan 
 Godin 
 Tišemir 
 Didodrag 
 Bučina 
 Krač  
 Bratič 
 Budislav 
 Dragoš 
 Dragič 
 Ljubin 
 Dražeta
 Tomiša

References

Further reading
Fine, J. V. A. "Aristodios and Rastudije – A Re-examination of the Question". Godiinjak drustva istorifara Borne i Hercegovine, 16 (1965), pp. 223–29.

13th century in Bosnia
14th century in Bosnia
15th century in Bosnia
Lists of Bosnia and Herzegovina people
djed

Bosnian Cyrillic texts
Texts of medieval Bosnia and Herzegovina
Medieval documents of Bosnia and Herzegovina
Written monuments of Bosnia and Herzegovina
National Monuments of Bosnia and Herzegovina